Mamou Region (Pular: 𞤁𞤭𞥅𞤱𞤢𞤤 𞤃𞤢𞥄𞤥𞤵𞤲) is located in central Guinea. It is bordered by the country of Sierra Leone and the Guinean regions of Faranah, Labé, and Kindia.

Administrative divisions
Mamou Region is divided into three prefectures; which are further sub-divided into 36 sub-prefectures:

 Dalaba Prefecture (10 sub-prefectures)
 Mamou Prefecture (14 sub-prefectures)
 Pita Prefecture (12 sub-prefectures)

References

 

Regions of Guinea